Henning Leopold Sundesson (21 April 1909 – 22 December 1990) was a Swedish long-distance runner. He competed in the men's 10,000 metres at the 1936 Summer Olympics.

References

External links
 

1909 births
1990 deaths
Athletes (track and field) at the 1936 Summer Olympics
Swedish male long-distance runners
Olympic athletes of Sweden
Place of birth missing